Bossa Nova Bacchanal is an album by American saxophonist Charlie Rouse recorded in 1962 and released in 1963 on the Blue Note label. It was the only album Rouse recorded as a leader for Blue Note. The CD reissue includes a bonus track recorded in 1965.

Reception

The AllMusic review by Thom Jurek awarded the album 4 stars and stated "Rouse's embrace of bossa nova, as well as other Latin and Caribbean music, is firmly rooted in jazz -- and not American jazz trying to be Brazilian. Rhythmically, Rouse, who is a hard bopper if there ever was one, takes the rhythmic and harmonic concepts of the samba, marries them to Afro-Caribbean folk styles, and burns it all through with the gloriously unapologetic swing of jazz... Ultimately, this is one of Rouse's finest moments as a leader".

The authors of The Penguin Guide to Jazz Recordings wrote: "If you know Charlie Rouse only as a Monk sideman, or from the tribute group Sphere, this will be a pleasant revelation."

Marc Davis of All About Jazz exclaimed: "What a happy record! And what a delightful change from the usual 1960s Blue Note formula." He concluded: "for any fan of happy, infectious, Latin-tinged jazz, Bossa Nova Bacchanal is a must have." AAJs Joshua Weiner called the recording "a fine album," and noted that "the selection of tunes is perfect."

Track listing

 "Back to the Tropics" (Leighla Whipper) - 3:57
 "Aconteceu" (Ed Lincoln, Silvio Rodríguez) - 3:00
 "Velhos Tempos" (Luiz Bonfá) - 4:50
 "Samba de Orfeu" (Bonfá, Antonio María) - 6:20
 "Un Dia" (Margarita Orelia Benskina, Rouse) - 5:56
 "Merci Bon Dieu" (Frantz Casseus) - 5:57
 "In Martinique" (Lionel Belasco, Whipper) - 5:29
 "One for Five" (Rouse) - 7:05 Bonus track on CD reissue

Recorded on November 26, 1962 (1-7) and January 22, 1965 (8).

Personnel
Charlie Rouse - tenor saxophone
Kenny Burrell, Chauncey "Lord" Westbrook - guitar
Larry Gales - bass
Willie Bobo - drums
Carlos "Patato" Valdes - conga
Garvin Masseaux - chekereOn bonus track'
Charlie Rouse - tenor saxophone
Freddie Hubbard - trumpet
McCoy Tyner - piano
Bob Cranshaw - bass
Billy Higgins - drums

References

Blue Note Records albums
Charlie Rouse albums
1963 albums
Albums produced by Alfred Lion
Albums recorded at Van Gelder Studio